John Bloomfield may refer to:

John Bloomfield (academic) (born 1932), Australian academic
John Bloomfield (British Army officer) (1793–1880), British Army general
John Bloomfield, 2nd Baron Bloomfield (1802–1879), British peer and diplomat
John Bloomfield (politician) (1901–1989), Australian politician in the government of Victoria
John Bloomfield (musician) (fl. 2000s), American musician and educator
John Bloomfield (sport shooter) (born 1956), English sports shooter